The American Mathematical Association of Two-Year Colleges (AMATYC) is an organization dedicated to the improvement of education in the first two years of college mathematics in the United States and Canada. AMATYC hosts an annual conference, summer institutes, workshops and mentoring for teachers in and outside math, and a semiannual math competition. AMATYC publishes one refereed journal, MathAMATYC Educator, and issues position statements on matters of mathematics education.

The math competition is held in spring and fall semester each year and is limited to problems in precalculus. Only students enrolled in two-year colleges are eligible to participate. Only students who haven't received any degree/diploma, including within or outside of the U.S, can enter the competition.

AMATYC was founded in 1974. Its office is at Southwest Tennessee Community College in Memphis, Tennessee.

AMATYC is divided into eight regions: Central, Mid-Atlantic, Midwest, Northeast, Northwest, Southeast, Southwest, and West. A vice president is assigned to each region.

See also 
Mathematical Association of America
National Council of Teachers of Mathematics

External links 
 
 Student Math League home page

Mathematics education in the United States
1974 establishments in Tennessee
Organizations based in Memphis, Tennessee
Organizations established in 1974